Jaimon Lidsey (born 27 February 1999) is an Australian speedway rider. He rides in the top tier of British Speedway, riding for the Belle Vue Aces in the SGB Premiership.

Career
He is twice a winner of the Australian Under-21 Individual Speedway Championship in 2018 and 2019 but his biggest success came in 2020 when he won the 2020 Individual Speedway Junior World Championship.

In 2019, he rode in the British leagues for the first time for Belle Vue in the SGB Premiership 2019. In 2023, he returned to action for Belle Vue Aces for the SGB Premiership 2023.

References 

1999 births
Living people
Australian speedway riders
Belle Vue Aces riders